The Bosch Blue Winds were a Japanese basketball team that played in the Japan Basketball League. They were based in Higashimatsuyama, Saitama.

Notable players
Yoshihiko Amano
Deron Feldhaus
Makoto Hasegawa
Tom Kleinschmidt
Marcus Liberty
Takeo Mabashi
Eric McArthur
John Murray (basketball)
Seiichi Oba
Kenji Okamura
Gerald Paddio
Andre Riddick
Dan Weiss (basketball)
Galen Young

References

Defunct basketball teams in Japan
Sports teams in Kanagawa Prefecture
Basketball teams established in 1950
Basketball teams disestablished in 2002
1950 establishments in Japan
2002 disestablishments in Japan